Jamaine is a given name. Notable people with the name include:

 Jamaine Wray, Jamaican rugby league footballer 
 Jamaine Jones (born 1998), Australian rules footballer
 Jamaine Winborne (born 1980), American football player

Masculine given names